The 15th Cinema Eye Honors recognized outstanding artistry and craft in nonfiction filmmaking of 2021 and took place at the Museum of the Moving Image in Astoria, New York on March 1, 2022. The ceremony was originally scheduled for January 13, 2022, but it was postponed due to COVID-19 pandemic-related concerns.

The nominations for the broadcast categories were announced on October 20, 2021. The complete list of nominations, including both broadcast and film, were announced on November 10, 2021.

Winners and nominees

Feature film
{| class="wikitable" style="width:95%"
|- 
! width="50%" | Outstanding Non-Fiction Feature
! width="50%" | Outstanding Direction
|-
|valign="top"|
 ''Flee – Directed by Jonas Poher Rasmussen; Produced by Monica Hellström and Signe Byrge Sørensen Ascension – Directed and Produced by Jessica Kingdon; Produced by Kira Simon-Kennedy and Nathan Truesdell
 Faya Dayi – Directed and Produced by Jessica Beshir
 The Rescue – Directed and Produced by E. Chai Vasarhelyi and Jimmy Chin; Produced by P.J. van Sandwjik and John Battsek
 Summer of Soul (...Or, When the Revolution Could Not Be Televised) – Directed by Ahmir "Questlove" Thompson; Produced by Joseph Patel, Robert Fyvolent and David Dinerstein
 The Velvet Underground – Directed and Produced by Todd Haynes; Produced by Christine Vachon, Julie Goldman, Christopher Clements, Carolyn Hepburn
|valign="top"|
 Procession – Robert Greene Ascension – Jessica Kingdon
 Faya Dayi – Jessica Beshir
 Flee – Jonas Poher Rasmussen
 In the Same Breath – Nanfu Wang
 Summer of Soul (...Or, When the Revolution Could Not Be Televised) – Ahmir "Questlove" Thompson
|-
! width="50%" | Outstanding Editing
! width="50%" | Outstanding Production
|-
|valign="top"|
 Summer of Soul (...Or, When the Revolution Could Not Be Televised) – Joshua Pearson Homeroom – Kristina Mohwani and Rebecca Adorno
 The Rescue – Bob Eisenhardt
 Roadrunner: A Film About Anthony Bourdain – Eileen Meyer and Aaron Wickenden
 The Velvet Underground – Affonso Gonçalves and Adam Kurnitz
|valign="top"|
 The First Wave – Matthew Heineman, Jenna Millman and Leslie Norville Flee – Monica Hellström and Signe Byrge Sørensen
 In the Same Breath – Nanfu Wang, Jialing Zhang, Julie Goldman, Christopher Clements and Carolyn Hepburm
 President – Signe Byrge Sørensen and Joslyn Barnes
 The Rescue – E. Chai Vasarhelyi, Jimmy Chin, P.J. van Sandwjik and John Battsek
|-
! width="50%" | Outstanding Cinematography
! width="50%" | Outstanding Original Score
|-
|valign="top"|
 Ascension – Jessica Kingdon and Nathan Truesdell All Light, Everywhere – Corey Hughes
 Cusp – Isabel Bethencourt
 Faya Dayi – Jessica Beshir
 The Rescue – David Katznelson, Picha Srisansanee and Ian Seabrook
|valign="top"|
 Ascension – Dan Deacon All Light, Everywhere – Dan Deacon
 Flee – Uno Helmersson
 Julia – Rachel Portman
 maini – towards the ocean, towards the shore – Thad Kellstadt
 Procession – Keegan DeWitt
|-
! width="50%" | Outstanding Sound Design
! width="50%" | Outstanding Graphic Design/Animation
|-
|valign="top"|
 The Velvet Underground – Leslie Shatz and Jahn Sood All Light, Everywhere – Udit Duseja
 Faya Dayi – Tom Efinger and Abigail Savage
 Flee – Edward Björner and Tormod Ringnes
 Summer of Soul (...Or, When the Revolution Could Not Be Televised) – Jimmy Douglass and Paul Hsu
|valign="top"|
 Flee – Kenneth Ladekjær Becoming Cousteau – Daniel Rutledge
 Rebel Hearts – Una Lorenzen and Emma Berliner
 The Sparks Brothers – Joseph Wallace
 Wojnarowicz: F*ck You F*ggot F*cker – Grant Nellessen and Andrew Rose
|-
! width="50%" | Outstanding Debut
! width="50%" | Outstanding Non-Fiction Short
|-
|valign="top"|
 Ascension – Directed by Jessica Kingdon A Cop Movie – Directed by Alonso Ruizpalacios
 Faya Dayi – Directed by Jessica Beshir
 Jacinta – Directed by Jessica Earnshaw
 Summer of Soul (..Or, When the Revolution Could Not Be Televised) – Directed by Ahmir "Questlove" Thompson
|valign="top"|
 Three Songs for Benazir – Directed by Elizabeth Mirzaei and Gulistan Mirzaei Águilas – Directed by Kristy Guevara-Flanagan and Maite Zubiaurre
 A Broken House – Directed by Jimmy Goldblum
 Don’t Go Tellin' Your Momma – Directed by Topaz Jones and rubberband
 Terror Contagion – Directed by Laura Poitras
|-
! width="50%" | Spotlight Award
! width="50%" | Heterodox Award
|-
|valign="top"|
 North by Current – Directed by Angelo Madsen Minax Fruits of Labor – Directed by Emily Cohen Ibañez
 The Neutral Ground – Directed by CJ Hunt
 Socks on Fire – Directed by Bo McGuire
 Two Gods – Directed by Zeshawn Ali
|valign="top"|
 El Planeta – Directed by Amalia Ulman Bo Burnham: Inside – Directed by Bo Burnham
 A Cop Movie – Directed by Alonso Ruizpalacios
 The Inheritance – Directed by Ephraim Asili
 The Souvenir Part II – Directed by Joanna Hogg
|-
! width="50%" | Audience Choice Prize
! width="50%" | The Unforgettables
|-
|valign="top"|
 The Rescue – Directed by E. Chai Vasarhelyi and Jimmy Chin Becoming Cousteau – Directed by Liz Garbus
 Billie Eilish: The World's a Little Blurry – Directed by R. J. Cutler
 Flee – Directed by Jonas Poher Rasmussen
 Homeroom – Directed by Peter Nicks
 Julia – Directed by Julie Cohen and Betsy West
 Lily Topples the World – Directed by Jeremy Workman
 Listening to Kenny G – Directed by Penny Lane
 Rita Moreno: Just a Girl Who Decided to Go for It – Directed by Mariem Pérez Riera
 Roadrunner: A Film About Anthony Bourdain – Directed by Morgan Neville
 The Sparks Brothers – Directed by Edgar Wright
 Summer of Soul (Or, When the Revolution Could Not Be Televised) – Directed by Ahmir "Questlove" Thompson
 Try Harder! – Directed by Debbie Lum
 The Velvet Underground – Directed by Todd Haynes
 Writing with Fire – Directed by Rintu Thomas and Sushmit Ghosh
|valign="top"|
 Flee – Amin Homeroom – Denilson Garibo Introducing, Selma Blair – Selma Blair Jacinta – Jacinta Hunt Lily Topples the World – Lily Hevesh Listening to Kenny G – Kenny G Mr. Bachmann and His Class – Mr. Bachmann My Name is Pauli Murray – Pauli Murray Not Going Quietly – Ady Barkan Procession – Joe Eldred, Mike Foreman, Ed Gavagan, Dan Laurine, Michael Sandridge, & Tom Viviano The Rescue – Rick Stanton Rita Moreno: Just a Girl Who Decided to Go for It – Rita Moreno Roadrunner: A Film About Anthony Bourdain – Anthony Bourdain The Sparks Brothers – Ron Mael and Russell Mael Writing with Fire – Meera Nevi|-
|}

Broadcast
{| class="wikitable" style="width:95%"
|- 
! width="50%" | Outstanding Broadcast Film
! width="50%" | Outstanding Nonfiction Series
|-
|valign="top"|
 In the Same Breath – Directed by Nanfu Wang (HBO) All In: The Fight for Democracy – Directed by Liz Garbus and Lisa Cortés (Prime Video)
 David Byrne's American Utopia – Directed by Spike Lee (HBO)
 Disclosure – Directed by Sam Feder (Netflix)
 Tina – Directed by Dan Lindsay and T. J. Martin (HBO)
|valign="top"|
 City So Real – Directed by Steve James (National Geographic) 1971: The Year that Music Changed Everything – Directed by Asif Kapadia, Danielle Peck and James Rogan (Apple TV+)
 Exterminate All the Brutes – Directed by Raoul Peck (HBO)
 The Lady and the Dale – Directed by Zackary Drucker and Nick Cammilleri (HBO)
 Last Chance U: Basketball – Directed by Greg Whiteley, Adam Leibowitz and Daniel George McDonald (Netflix)
 Philly D.A. – Directed by Yoni Brook, Ted Passon and Nicole Salazar (Independent Lens/PBS)
|-
! width="50%" | Outstanding Anthology Series
! width="50%" | Shorts List Film
|-
|valign="top"|
 Pretend It's a City – Martin Scorsese, Fran Liebowitz, David Tedeschi, Ted Griffin, Emma Tillinger Koskoff, Joshua Porter and Margaret Bodde, Executive Producers (Netflix) Earth at Night in Color – Alex Williamson, Executive Producer (Apple TV+)
 Generation Hustle – Angie Day and Yon Motskin, Executive Producers (HBO Max)
 High on the Hog: How African American Cuisine Transformed America – Fabienne Toback, Karis Jagger and Roger Ross Williams, Executive Producers (Netflix)
 How To with John Wilson – Nathan Fielder, Michael Koman, Clark Reinking and John Wilson, Executive Producers (HBO)
 Taste the Nation with Padma Lakshmi – Padma Lakshmi, David Shadrack Smith and Sarina Roma, Executive Producers (Hulu)
|valign="top"|
 Elena – Directed by Michèle Stephenson
 Jobs for All! – Directed by Axel Danielson & Maximilien Van Aertryck
 The Last Cruise – Directed by Hannah Olson
 Takeover – Directed by Emma Francis-Snyder
 We Were There to Be There – Directed by Mike Plante and Jason Willis
 Your Street – Directed by Güzin Kar
|-
! width="50%" | Outstanding Broadcast Editing
! width="50%" | Outstanding Broadcast Cinematography
|-
|valign="top"|
 How To with John Wilson – Adam Locke-Norton (HBO) Allen v. Farrow – Mikaela Shwer, Parker Laramie and Sara Newens (HBO)
 City So Real – David E. Simpson and Steve James (National Geographic)
 David Byrne's American Utopia – Adam Gough (HBO)
 Exterminate All the Brutes – Directed by Alexandra Strauss (HBO)
|valign="top"|
 David Byrne's American Utopia – Ellen Kuras (HBO) 100 Foot Wave – Nominees to be determined (HBO)
 City So Real – Jackson James and Steve James (National Geographic)
 Earth at Night in Color – Nominees to be determined (Apple TV+)
 High on the Hog: How African American Cuisine Transformed America – Jerry Henry (Netflix)
|-
|}

Legacy Award
 The Watermelon Woman'' – Written and directed by Cheryl Dunye; Produced by Alexandra Juhasz and Barry Swimar; Edited by Annie Taylor; Cinematography by Michelle Crenshaw; Original Score by Paul Shapiro

References

External links
 Official website

2021 film awards
2022 awards in the United States
Events postponed due to the COVID-19 pandemic